Camille Wardrop Alleyne (born Port-of-Spain, Trinidad, October 12, 1966) is an American aerospace engineer, space scientist, and science ambassador. She is the Associate Program Scientist for the international Space Station at NASA's Johnson Space Center in Houston, Texas.

Education and early career 
Alleyne was born and raised in Port of Spain, Trinidad and Tobago. She studied at Howard University in Washington, D.C. where she earned her Bachelor of Science in mechanical engineering with an aerospace option. Because her hopes of working for NASA were delayed after her she finished her undergraduate study, Alleyne decided to pursue a Masters from Florida A&M University in mechanical engineering with a specialization in composite materials.

Alleyne was one of two persons in her program recruited by NASA to work at the Kennedy Space Center as a flight systems engineer. She worked there for two years before she attended the University of Maryland to pursue another Masters in aerospace engineering with a specialization in hypersonic aerodynamics and propulsion. After graduating with her second Masters, she was recruited to work at the Naval Sea Systems Command on ship missile systems.  She was then offered a position at the Missile Defense Agency under the U.S. Department of Defense to work on several ballistic missile defense projects as an aerospace systems engineer. These projects included the Ground-Based Midcourse Interceptor and Aegis Weapon System. Alleyne's work with the Department of Defense spanned eight years.

NASA 
Alleyne returned to NASA and worked on Constellation and Orion program as a lead system engineer and crew module systems engineer, and test manager, respectively. She worked with a team of engineers on the design and development of the Orion crew exploration vehicles responsible for transporting astronauts to destinations beyond Low Earth Orbit such as the moon, asteroids and, potentially, Mars.

Alleyne currently serves as an associate program scientist for the International Space Station, based at NASA's Lyndon B. Johnson Space Centre in Houston, Texas. Her roles as associate program scientist include communicating the ISS's scientific accomplishments with the general public, the leaders at NASA, the U.S. Congress, and scientific and educational communities. She also plays a leading role in the international education programs across the ISS Partners. During her tenure, she pursued her Doctorate in Education in Educational Leadership from the University of Houston.

Alleyne has earned several accolades for her work. Awards from NASA include a Commendation Award by NASA Johnson Space Center Director for her outstanding leadership and contribution to NASA’s mission; NASA Group Achievement Award for the ISS Benefits for Humanity Task Team in 2013; Certificate of Appreciation for the Transformation of the International Space Station to 6-person Crew Capabilities in 2009; the NASA Group Achievement Award for Constellation Requirements Development Team in 2007; and the NASA Group Achievement Award for Exploration Systems Architecture Study in 2006.

Awards and honors 
Alleyne has received numerous other awards and commendations from national and international organizations including being awarded Outstanding Woman in Aerospace by the National Society of Black Engineers and Distinguished Alumni award from FAMU/FSU College of Engineering. In 2011, the National Institute for Higher Education, Research, Science and Technology (NIHERST) in Trinidad and Tobago named her as one of the Caribbean’s icons in Science and Technology.  Alleyne is a member of the International Astronautical Federation (IAF) Workforce Development and Space Education and Outreach Committees; Delta Sigma Theta sorority and The Ninety-Nines: International Organization of Women Pilots.

Philanthropy 
In 2007, Alleyne founded The Brightest Stars Foundation, a 501(c)3 non-governmental organization that is dedicated to educating, empowering and inspiring young women to be future leaders through the study of science, math and technology. The organization provides mentorship to young women from all across the world, providing them with the tools needed to select careers in the science, technology, engineering and mathematics (STEM) and successfully matriculate through secondary and tertiary education in these fields.

References

External links 
Official website

American aerospace engineers
1966 births
Living people
People from Port of Spain
Howard University alumni
Florida A&M University alumni
NASA people